Remøya is an island in the municipality of Herøy in Møre og Romsdal county, Norway. The island is located north of the municipal center of Fosnavåg. The  island is connected to other islands via a network of bridges. The Remøy Bridge connects it to the island Leinøya (to the south) and the Runde Bridge connects it to Runde (to the north). Virtually all of the island's residents live on the southern portion of the island in the  village area called Remøy. The island had a population of 330 in 2015.

See also
List of islands of Norway

References

Islands of Møre og Romsdal
Herøy, Møre og Romsdal
Sunnmøre